Driving Not Knowing is a 2015 American semi-autobiographical musical drama film directed by Benjamin R. Davis, Dylan Hansen-Fliedner, Dane Mainella and Jay Jadick. The film received the Alternative Spirit Award, First Prize from the Rhode Island International Film Festival.

Cast
 Dane Mainella as Will, a poet
 Jay Jadick as Lee, a musician
 Emily Rea as Jo, Will's friend
 Kenneth Goldsmith as Lenny
 Seth Schimmel as Noah
 Michael Wintermute as Paul
 Charley Ruddell as Chaz
 Bruce Spears as Corn, a drug dealer
 Jessup Lepkowski as Allen
 Liz Barr as Abby
 Theodore Jadick as Ted
 Debra Jadick as Debbie
 Alexa Nicolas as Mae
 Caroline Kee as Cybil
 Joe Tirella as Bouncer
 Janie Ruddell as Minor

Production

The film was produced on a low budget with filming locations around rural Pennsylvania. The film has been described as "semi-autobiographical" by Mainella and Jadick because it incorporates some of their own personal storylines within fictional scenarios.

Reception
Stephen Farber of The Hollywood Reporter praised the film for its cinematography saying that it makes "this rural gateway enticing" and the music for being "intermiittently engaging". However, he criticized the characters for being thinly drawn and the actors' lack of charisma. He pointed  out to Brokeback Mountain, another gay film, for how it should be done.

References

American LGBT-related films
American musical drama films
LGBT-related musical drama films
2015 LGBT-related films
2010s English-language films
2010s American films